Adrien Pinot (born 6 May 2001) is a French professional football player who plays as a defender for Saint-Priest.

Club career 
Pinot was a youth product of Chambly before moving to Metz at 16, then returning to Chambly in 2020. Pinot made his professional debut with Chambly in a 1–1 Ligue 2 tie with Niort on 27 January 2021.

In July 2021, he joined Championnat National 2 club Saint-Priest.

Personal life
Pinot is the nephew of the retired footballer José Pinot.

References

External links

2001 births
Living people
Sportspeople from Beauvais
French footballers
Association football midfielders
FC Chambly Oise players
AS Saint-Priest players
Ligue 2 players
Championnat National 2 players
Footballers from Hauts-de-France